Alfred I. Johnson (January 10, 1898 – February 15, 1977) was a Minnesota politician and a Speaker of the Minnesota House of Representatives. Born on a farm, he became a livestock farmer himself. He was elected to the Minnesota House of Representatives in 1940, where he caucused Liberal Caucus with the then-nonpartisan body. When liberals gained control of the body in 1955, he became speaker, a position he would hold until he left the body in 1959.

After leaving the legislature, Johnson served on the Board of Regents for the University of Minnesota. He died in 1977.

References

 

1898 births
1977 deaths
Speakers of the Minnesota House of Representatives
Members of the Minnesota House of Representatives
20th-century American politicians
People from Swift County, Minnesota
People from Benson, Minnesota